Clupeocharax schoutedeni is a species of African tetra endemic to the Democratic Republic of Congo.

Information
The Clupeocharax schoutedeni is the only member of its genus. The amount of mature Clupeocharax schoutedeni has been slowly declining, and this has allowed this species to be recorded as vulnerable to becoming an endangered species. It is native to Lake Tumba, Lake Yandja, and the Central Congo River basin. They live in a pelagic habitat within a freshwater species. One of the main threats to reduce the population of this species is fishing with nets. The average length of the Clupeocharax schoutedeni as an unsexed male is about 25 centimeters or 9.5 inches. They are mainly found in Africa within the Democratic Republic of the Congo.

Classification
The taxonomic classification of the Clupeocharax schoutedeni is as follows:
Kingdom-Animalia
Phylum-Chordata
Subphylum-Vertebrata
Superclass-Gnathostomata
Order-Characiformes
Family-Alestidae
Genus-Clupeocharax
Species-Clupeocharax schoutedeni

References

Notes
 

Alestidae
Monotypic fish genera
Endemic fauna of the Democratic Republic of the Congo
Fish of the Democratic Republic of the Congo
Taxa named by Jacques Pellegrin
Fish described in 1926